Soldiers of the Night is the first studio album by the American heavy metal band Vicious Rumors, released in 1985 through Shrapnel Records (United States) and Roadrunner Records (Europe); a remastered edition was reissued in 2010. It is notably the only Vicious Rumors album to feature vocalist Gary St. Pierre as well as guitarist Vinnie Moore, the latter of whom would release his own debut album, Mind's Eye, in 1986.

Track listing

Personnel
Vicious Rumors
Gary St. Pierre – lead and background vocals
Geoff Thorpe – guitar, background vocals
Vinnie Moore – guitar
Dave Starr – bass, background vocals
Larry Howe – drums, gong, tubular bells

Production
 Lionel Baker II  –  cover art
Steve Fontano – engineer, producer
Steve Pollutro  –  logo design
Jim Marshall  –  photography
Tim Gennert – remastering (reissue)

References

Vicious Rumors albums
1985 debut albums
Shrapnel Records albums
Roadrunner Records albums